Yangzom Brauen (born 18 April 1980 in Switzerland) is a Swiss actress, activist and writer.

Life and work 
Brauen, the daughter of Swiss ethnologist Martin Brauen and Tibetan artist Sonam Dolma Brauen, started her acting career with small roles in Swiss television series. She had her Hollywood debut in the film Aeon Flux in the role of Inari. Since then, she has played in various American independent productions including a minor role in Al Pacino's Salomaybe, an adaptation of Oscar Wilde's Salome and the leading part in the German film Asudem (2006) by Daryush Shokof.

In addition to her acting work, Brauen has drawn media attention with her public advocacy on behalf of the Tibetan people. In 1999, she co-organised demonstrations against Chinese leader Jiang Zemin's visit to Switzerland, and in 2001 a photograph of her being arrested in Moscow during a protest against the award of the 2008 Summer Olympics to Beijing was used in news reports worldwide.

Eisenvogel ("Iron Bird"), Brauen's account of her grandmother Kunsang's and her mother Sonam's escape from Tibet, and her own youth in exile, was published in 2009 and became a bestseller in Germany. It was later published in English as Across Many Mountains.

Works

Filmography

Books
 Published in English as:

References

External links
 

personal website

1980 births
Living people
People from Bern
Swiss television actresses
Swiss film actresses
Swiss activists
Swiss women activists
Swiss people of Tibetan descent